The Bayview Bridge is a Deck truss bridge over the West Don River in Toronto, Ontario, Canada. The six-lane bridge carries Bayview Avenue across the Don Valley, connecting with Lawrence Avenue East at its southern end. Built in 1929 by Harold Babcock, the bridge helped spur the development of the Bridle Path, an affluent neighbourhood northeast of the bridge's span.

Restoration work on the bridge was done in 1969 and 1994 by Metro Transportation (shown on plaque along the middle of the bridge).

The bridge is also used as part of the detour route for traffic moving east to Lawrence Avenue East (via Post Road and Bridle Path) or west to Lawrence Avenue West. Lawrence Avenue East section west of Park Lane Circle ends at the eastern side of the bridge

Areas near the bridge:

 York University Glendon College
 Toronto French School
 Granite Club
 CNIB
 Crescent School

Bridges in Toronto
Road bridges in Ontario
1929 establishments in Ontario